The globe-horned chameleon or flat-casqued chameleon (Calumma globifer) is a large species of chameleon  endemic to isolated pockets of humid primary forest in eastern and south eastern Madagascar. It is listed on CITES Appendix II, meaning trade in this species is regulated.

Description
Colour variations include red-brown, yellow, black, white, and green.

References

  ARKive.com. Accessed 26-10-2012

Calumma
Endemic fauna of Madagascar
Reptiles of Madagascar
Reptiles described in 1879
Taxa named by Albert Günther